Eaton Township is a civil township of Eaton County in the U.S. state of Michigan. The population was 4,278 at the 2000 United States Census.

Communities
The community is at the junction of four townships, Walton to the southwest, Brookfield to the southeast, Eaton to the northeast, and Carmel to the northwest.
 Packard is a former community which has been largely absorbed into the northeast portion of Charlotte.

Geography

Demographics
As of the 2000 United States Census, there were 4,278 people, 1,531 households, and 1,249 families in the township. The racial makeup of the township was 96.31% White, 0.23% African American, 0.37% Native American, 0.89% Asian, 0.07% Pacific Islander, 1.03% from other races, and 1.10% from two or more races. Hispanic or Latino of any race were 2.57% of the population.

There were 1,531 households, out of which 38.5% had children under the age of 18 living with them, 69.4% were married couples living together, 7.8% had a female householder with no husband present, and 18.4% were non-families. 15.6% of all households were made up of individuals, and 6.5% had someone living alone who was 65 years of age or older. The average household size was 2.76 and the average family size was 3.04.

In the township the population was spread out, with 27.2% under the age of 18, 6.5% from 18 to 24, 29.2% from 25 to 44, 27.3% from 45 to 64, and 9.8% who were 65 years of age or older. The median age was 38 years. For every 100 females, there were 98.0 males. For every 100 females age 18 and over, there were 95.4 males.

The median income for a household in the township was $55,518, and the median income for a family was $57,870. Males had a median income of $45,171 versus $27,093 for females. The per capita income for the township was $23,379.  About 3.3% of families and 3.9% of the population were below the poverty line, including 3.5% of those under age 18 and 7.5% of those age 65 or over.

References

Townships in Eaton County, Michigan
Lansing–East Lansing metropolitan area
Townships in Michigan